
Historical records of this award have been spotty, and the following is a compiled list of the verified SWAC Players of the Year.

The Southwestern Athletic Conference Men's Basketball Player of the Year is an annual basketball award given to the Southwestern Athletic Conference's (SWAC) most outstanding player.

Key

Winners

Winners by school

Footnotes
  Please see the talk page for an e-mail correspondence with Tom Galbraith, who at the time of the exchanges was the SWAC men's basketball contact.
  The University of Arkansas at Pine Bluff was a conference member from 1936 to 1970, left, but then re-joined in 1998.

References

NCAA Division I men's basketball conference players of the year
Player